Balam is a 2009 Tamil-language romantic drama film written and directed by Murali Krishna. The film stars Arvind Vinod and Deepa Chari, while Suhasini and Rahman appear in further supporting roles. Featuring music composed by Yugendran, the film was released on 25 December 2009.

Cast

Production
Director  Murali Krishna launched Arvind Vinod, a VJ on Sun Music, as the lead actor in the film. Likewise, model Deepa Chari from Mumbai was cast as the heroine for her first Tamil venture.

Release
A reviewer from Rediff.com stated it was "movies like C J Reddy Enterprises' Balam, directed by Muralikrishna, make you realise how a film with an experienced cast can go haywire, thanks to a few silly elements that simply take away the joy of story-telling". The reviewer added "what's even more puzzling is what veteran actors like Rahman and Suhasini are doing in a film where there's no scope to flex even a little finger, let alone acting muscles". The film had a low key opening at the Tamil box office and did not perform well commercially.

References

2009 films
2000s Tamil-language films
2009 romantic drama films